Heath is an unincorporated community in central Alberta in the Municipal District of Wainwright No. 61, located  south of Highway 14,  southwest of Lloydminster.

The community was named after a railroad employee.

References

Localities in the Municipal District of Wainwright No. 61